Holoperas innotata is a species of snout moth in the genus Holoperas. It was described by William Warren in 1891. It is found in Colombia.

References 

Moths described in 1891
Chrysauginae